The men's team large hill/4 × 5 km Nordic combined competition for the 2014 Winter Olympics in Sochi, Russia, was held at RusSki Gorki Jumping Center on 20 February.

Results

Ski jumping
The Ski jumping was started at 12:00.

Cross-country
The cross-country skiing was started at 15:00.

References

Nordic combined at the 2014 Winter Olympics